Ivan D'Cruz (born in Tanzania, Africa) from Cannanore, now known as Kannur district in Kerala was an Indian cricketer. He was a left-handed batsman and left-arm medium-pace bowler who played for Kerala.

D'Cruz made a single first-class appearance for the side, during the 1970-71 season, against Andhra Pradesh. From the middle order, he scored 2 runs in the first innings in which he batted, and 10 runs in the second.

D'Cruz bowled 7 overs in the match, but failed to take a wicket.

Ivan D'Cruz has also represented Kerala in Hockey.

External links
Ivan D'Cruz at Cricket Archive 

Indian cricketers
Kerala cricketers
Tanzanian cricketers
People from Kannur district
Cricketers from Kerala